The Florida-class battleships of the United States Navy comprised two ships:  and . Launched in 1910 and 1909 respectively and commissioned in 1911, they were slightly larger than the preceding  design but were otherwise very similar. This was the first US battleship class in which all ships received steam turbine engines. In the previous Delaware-class,  received steam turbine propulsion as an experiment while  retained triple-expansion engines.

Both ships were involved in the 1914 Second Battle of Vera Cruz, deploying their Marine contingents as part of the operation. Following the entrance of the United States into World War I in 1917, both ships were deployed to Europe. Florida was assigned to the British Grand Fleet and based in Scapa Flow; in December 1918 she escorted President Woodrow Wilson to France for the peace negotiations. Utah was assigned to convoy escort duty; she was based in Ireland and was tasked with protecting convoys as they approached the European continent.

Retained under the Washington Naval Treaty of 1922, both ships were modernized significantly, with torpedo bulges and oil-fired boilers installed and other improvements made, but were demilitarized under terms of the 1930 London Naval Treaty. Florida was scrapped, Utah converted into first a radio-controlled target ship, then an anti-aircraft gunnery trainer. She served in the latter role until sunk by the Japanese during the attack on Pearl Harbor on 7 December 1941. Her hull, never raised, remains on the bottom of the harbor as a war memorial.

Design 

The Floridas were the third of 10 separate classes built between 1906 and 1919, a total of 22 battleships being commissioned. The new dreadnoughts of the American battle line were being designed from pre-dreadnought experience and observation of foreign designs, as no US dreadnought had yet been commissioned at the time that the Floridas were designed; all were either at some stage of building or in design. American capital ship design was also heavily influenced by war games conducted at the US Navy's Naval War College. Captain William Sims led a reform movement that assigned warship design to the General Board.

These ships were an improvement over the preceding . Their engine rooms were larger to hold four Curtis or Parsons steam turbines. Their larger beam gave them greater metacentric height, in which the Delawares were notably deficient, which improved buoyancy and reduced hull stress. The ships mounted new /51 caliber guns as secondary batteries in casemates that boasted increased armor protection. The class retained the large and fully enclosed conning towers that were adopted for the preceding Delawares, as a result of American studies of the Battle of Tsushima in 1905. The design reduced the vulnerability of the command staff. Overall, these ships were much better protected than their British counterparts, although they were modified extensively during the interwar period.

General characteristics 

The ships also had some of their superstructure rearranged, including the lattice masts and the funnels. The Florida-class ships had a crew of 1,001 officers and men. The wider beam increased the vessels' metacentric height, which allowed the Floridas to accommodate their larger medium-caliber guns without any real penalty in topweight.

Florida was fitted experimentally with a larger bridge than was then standard, to house both ship and fire control personnel under armor, while Utah received a heavily armored fire-control tower atop a standard-sized bridge. The former proved especially successful, to the point that when a larger armored fire-control tower and standard bridge was proposed for the Nevada class, it was rejected in favor of a roomier bridge like that of Florida.

The ships also had their rear lattice masts removed and replaced with a pole mast. A catapult for launching aircraft was mounted on the number 3 gun turret.

Propulsion 

The ships were propelled by four-shaft Parsons steam turbines; steam was provided by 12 Babcock & Wilcox coal-fired boilers. However, the engine and boiler room arrangements remained the same as in the Delawares, with the engine room situated between the rear main turrets and steam lines running beneath the superfiring rear turret.

The engine rooms on these ships were lengthened to accommodate the larger Parsons steam turbines, which meant the after boiler room had to be eliminated. Funnel spacing was therefore closer than in the Delawares. During Florida and Utahs reconstruction in 1925–1927, their coal-fired boilers were replaced with four White-Forster oil-fired boilers. The reduction in the number of boilers allowed their twin funnels to be trunked into one single larger funnel.

Armament

Main guns 
It was intended originally to arm these ships with eight /45 caliber guns then in development in superfiring fore-and-aft mountings. As this gun did not go into service until 1914, the arrangement of ten /45 caliber Mark 5 guns in five twin gun turrets was retained from the Delaware class. The gun housings were the Mark 8 type, and they allowed for depression to −5 degrees and elevation to 15 degrees. The guns had a rate of fire of 2 to 3 rounds per minute. They fired  shells, of either armor-piercing (AP) or Common types, though the Common type was obsolete by 1915 and put out of production. The guns were expected to fire 175 rounds before the barrels would require replacement. The two ships carried 100 shells per gun, or 1,000 rounds in total. At 15 degrees elevation, the guns could hit targets out to approximately 

Unfortunately, the turret layout of the Delawares was also retained, with its respective challenges. Two turrets, Numbers 1 and 2, were mounted fore in a superfiring pair, while the other three were mounted aft of the main superstructure, all on the centerline. The rearmost turret, number 5, was placed on the main deck, facing rearward, the next turret, Number 4, was placed on the main deck facing forward, but could only have fired on either broadside, it could not have fired straight forward or aft. The center turret, Number 3, placed in a superfiring position facing rearward, could not fire astern when the turret directly under it had its guns trained forward. This left only the rearmost turret, with its pair of 12-inch guns, to cover the rear quarter of the ship. Also, since the engine room was situated between the superfiring rear turret and the ones behind it, steam lines ran from the boiler rooms amidships around the ammunition magazine for Number 3 turret to the engine room. These lines, it was later found, had the potential to heat the powder in the magazine and degrade its ballistics. This design flaw was also prevalent in several British dreadnoughts but was considered inescapable by naval designers on structural grounds.

Other weapons 

C&R proposed  secondary guns for these ships, protected by  casemate armor. This would have been the only change from the protective scheme carried over from the Delaware class. However, a new 5-inch/51 caliber gun was adopted instead after concerns about inadequate splinter protection for secondary gun casemates and smoke uptakes led to an increase in armor. Sixteen of these weapons were fitted in individual casemates. The guns could depress to −10 degrees and elevate to 15 degrees. The guns were manually operated, and had a range of train of about 150 degrees in either direction.

Florida and Utah received two /23 caliber guns in 1917 for anti-aircraft (AA) defense. This was increased to eight guns between 1926 and 1928.

The ships were also armed with two  submerged torpedo tubes. The tubes were mounted one on each broadside.

Armor 

The armor layout was largely the same as in the preceding Delaware-class battleships. After modernization, some of the casemated guns were moved to the superstructure; these guns were protected with only  of armor.

Construction 

Florida, ordered under hull number "Battleship #30", was laid down at the Brooklyn Navy Yard in New York on 9 March 1909. She was launched on 12 May 1910, after which fitting out work commenced. She was completed on 15 September 1911, and commissioned into the United States Navy. Utah was ordered under hull number "Battleship #31". She was laid down in Camden, New Jersey, at the New York Shipbuilding Corporation, 6 days later on 15 March. Work proceeded faster on Utah than on her sister ship, and she was launched about four and a half months earlier, on 23 December 1909. Her fitting out lasted until 31 August 1911, when she was commissioned into the Navy.

Service history

USS Florida 

Florida took part in the Second battle of Vera Cruz in 1914. She and her sister Utah were the first two ships on the scene; the two ships landed some 1,000 sailors and Marines under the command of Floridas captain on 21 April. Fighting lasted for 3 days; the contingent from Florida and Utah suffered a total of 94 casualties.

After the United States entered World War I in April 1917, Florida was dispatched to Europe; she departed the United States in December 1917. After arriving in the North Sea, she was assigned to the British Grand Fleet. The ship, part of the US Navy's Battleship Division Nine, under the command of Rear Admiral Hugh Rodman, arrived on 7 December and was assigned to the 6th Battle Squadron of the Grand Fleet. Following training exercises with the British fleet, 6th Battle Squadron was tasked with convoy protection duty on the route to Scandinavia. Following the end of the war, in December 1918, the ship escorted President Woodrow Wilson on his trip to Europe to participate in the peace negotiations at Versailles. Later in December, Florida returned to the United States to participate in the Victory Fleet Review in New York harbor.

Post-war, Florida returned to the US Navy's Atlantic Fleet; she operated along the east coast of the United States and into Central America. In July 1920, she was assigned the hull number "BB-30". In December 1920, she carried the US Secretary of State, Bainbridge Colby, on a diplomatic trip around the Caribbean and South America. Florida was the oldest American battleship that was retained under the terms of the Washington Naval Treaty of 1922. She underwent extensive reconstruction and modernization during the mid-1920s. After emerging from the shipyard, she was assigned as the flagship of the Control Force, US Fleet. The ship conducted a series of training cruises for the remainder of the decade. Under the London Naval Treaty of 1930, the ship was to be discarded. She was decommissioned in February 1931 and towed to the Philadelphia Naval Shipyard, where she was broken up for scrap.

USS Utah 

Utahs first assignment was with the US Navy's Atlantic Fleet. During 1913, she took a goodwill voyage to the Mediterranean. Utah was also involved in the Second Battle of Vera Cruz, alongside her sister Florida. The ship also saw front-line duty in the First World War, although she was not attached to the British Grand Fleet. Starting in September 1918, Utah was based in Bantry Bay, Ireland. Here she conducted convoy escort duties on the approach to Europe.

Post-war service saw Utah again in the Atlantic Fleet; during 1921–22, she was stationed in Europe. Utah was also retained under the Washington Naval Treaty. In 1924–1925, the ship sailed on a goodwill cruise to South America. Following her return to the United States, she was taken into dry dock for significant reconstruction. After she rejoined the active fleet, she was assigned to the US Scouting Fleet. Late in 1928, she steamed to the South Atlantic, where she picked up President-Elect Herbert Hoover, who was returning from an ambassadorial visit to several South American countries.

According to the London Naval Treaty, the ship was to be removed from front-line service. In 1931 she had her main battery guns removed and was converted into a radio-controlled target ship. She was redesignated AG-16, and served in this capacity through 1941. In 1935 she was rebuilt again, gaining a single /75 caliber anti-aircraft gun in a quadruple mount for experimental testing and development of the new type of weapon. She continued her role as a target ship, and in 1941 had several additional anti-aircraft guns installed to increase her capacity to train gunners. Later that year she was transferred to the US Pacific Fleet and based in Pearl Harbor. She was present in Pearl Harbor on 7 December 1941, was hit by two torpedoes, capsized, and sank. A few years later, the hull was partially righted and towed closer to Ford Island in a failed salvage effort, where the wreck remains today.

Footnotes

References

Further reading
 

Battleship classes
 
World War I battleships of the United States